LuLaRich is an American documentary miniseries, directed and produced by Jenner Furst and Julia Willoughby Nason and executive produced by Blye Pagon Faust and Cori Shepherd Stern. It follows LuLaRoe, a clothing empire accused of being a pyramid scheme. It consists of four episodes and premiered on Amazon Prime Video on September 10, 2021.

Plot
The series investigates LuLaRoe, a pyramid scheme. It features former employees, sellers, and the owners of the company DeAnne Brady and Mark Stidham.

It features interviews with journalist Jill Filipovic and MLM expert Robert L. FitzPatrick.

Production
After seeing so many LuLaRoe posts from her social circle, Executive Producer Cori Shepherd Stern brought the idea for a LuLaRoe documentary to her filmmaking partner, Blye Pagon Faust. Stern and Faust then approached Jenner Furst and Julia Willoughby Nason with the idea. In July 2020, it was announced Furst and Nason would direct and produce the documentary series revolving around LuLaRoe, with Furst and Nason serving as producers under their Cinemart banner.

In August 2021, it was announced Amazon Studios would co-produce the series, with Amazon Prime Video distributing.

References

External links
 

Amazon Prime Video original programming
Documentary television series about crime in the United States
2020s American documentary television series
2021 American television series debuts
2021 American television series endings
Television series by Amazon Studios
English-language television shows